Pullingo (meaning squad of friends) is a Tamil slang that became a phenomenon in 2019. It mainly refers to male teenagers from North Chennai in India who color their hair, have unique hairstyles, wear skinny jeans, ride Honda Dio scooters and engage in reckless driving in the name of street race. They use specific slang varieties. The term is found in several districts of Tamil Nadu.

The term was popularized by the 2019 Gaana song "Gumbalaga Suthuvom" by Gaana Stephen, which got 50 million views in 7 months.

Some feel that the term has been used in a derogatory manner. The term was mocked in a YouTube video by Eruma Saani which, after public outcry, was taken down.

Notes

References 

Social groups of Tamil Nadu
Social stereotypes
Indian slang